Brunero is a surname. Notable people with the surname include:

Giovanni Brunero (1895–1934), Italian cyclist
John Brunero, American philosopher
Tim Brunero (born 1976), Australian Big Brother contestant and journalist

See also
Bruner